Dennis Henry Burkley (September 10, 1945 – July 14, 2013) was an American actor. In a career spanning four decades, he appeared in numerous films and television series. He was best known for his role as Theo in Son in Law.

Early life
Burkley was born in Los Angeles, California, the son of Imogene (née Ware) and Henry Burkley. He grew up in Grand Prairie, Texas, and graduated from Texas Christian University.

Career

In his 1980s and 1990s appearances, Burkley was most recognizable for his large  and  frame, scruffy beard, and Southern accent. 

In the 1970s,
he established himself as a television character actor with appearances on many programs, including Mary Hartman, Mary Hartman, Maude,  
the Rockford Files, and Quincy, M.E.. In the 1980s, he came into his own as an actor with a high profile role on Hill Street Blues and another memorable role as Cal, the Texas-born junkyard partner of Fred G. Sanford in Sanford, the short-lived Sanford and Son sequel from 1980-1981. He provided the voice of several supporting characters on the animated television series King of the Hill (set in his home state of Texas). In 2005, he wrote and directed a film titled Repetition and also played a small role in the television series My Name Is Earl.

In films, he played Dozer, a biker with a severe speech impediment who befriends Rocky Dennis and his mother in the movie Mask. Burkley appeared in the drug culture drama Rush in 1991, the Chevy Chase comedy Fletch Lives, and Sylvester Stallone's Stop! Or My Mom Will Shoot. He appeared in the Kevin Costner golf comedy Tin Cup.

Personal life
Burkley was married to Laura Alderdice from 1967 until his death. They had two children.

He died of a heart attack in Los Angeles, California, on July 14, 2013.

Filmography

Film

Television

References

External links

1945 births
2013 deaths
People from Grand Prairie, Texas
Male actors from Los Angeles
American male film actors
American male television actors
American male voice actors
People from Van Nuys, Los Angeles
Grand Prairie High School alumni
Texas Christian University alumni
20th-century American male actors
21st-century American male actors
Male actors from Texas
Film directors from Los Angeles
Film directors from Texas